David Guerrier (born 2 December 1984) is a French classical trumpeter and cornet player.

Life 
Born in Pierrelatte, Guerrier began his musical studies in 1990 at the Conservatoire du Tricastin first at the piano, then at the age of seven, he began to play the trumpet in Serge Vivarès' class. He met Pierre Dutot in Grasse in 1994 during an internship and joined his class at the Conservatoire de Lyon in 1997 after having obtained a special exemption given his young age (13 years). He perfected his skills there until 2000, also learning the baroque trumpet with Jean-François Madeuf, already developing his taste for playing the works studied on the original instruments of the composition. At the age of eleven, he participated in L'École des fans dedicated to Maurice André and five years later won the 1st Grand Prix de la Ville de Paris of the famous .

In 2004, he was named Instrumental "Soloist of the Year" at the Victoires de la musique classique as a trumpeter. He received the same award in 2007 for his performance of the second movement of the Concerto by Henri Tomasi with the Orchestre national de France.

He started learning the French horn in 2002 and very quickly became principal horn player of the Orchestre national de France.

He studied at the French horn at the Conservatoire de Lyon until June 2006, applied for the position of horn teacher at the same school and was appointed in September 2006. But the management of the Conservatoire de Lyon did not want him to be both a student and a teacher, so he had to resign from the rank of student to be able to teach. He is a member of the Philharmonic Chamber (Emmanuel Krivine) and has also been principal horn player of the Orchestre de chambre de Paris (Kurt Masur) from 2004 to 2009 and then to the Luxembourg Philharmonic Orchestra (E. Krivine) from 2009 to 2010.

Today, he is the principal trumpeter in the same ensemble.

He has also recently started playing the tuba, trombone, violin and ophicleide.

He attaches particular importance to interpreting works in the repertoire on instruments played at the time they were created. A few years ago, he founded the Turbulences ensemble (brass and percussion), an ensemble with variable geometry, which rediscovers the original repertoire by performing it on period instruments.

His repertoire includes in particular Saint-Saëns' Septet (trumpet, two violins, viola, cello, double bass and piano) with the Capuçon brothers (Renaud and Gautier) and Frank Braley; Mozart's 4th horn concerto, and Leopold Mozart's Concerto for trumpet with the Orchestre de chambre de Paris (John Nelson); Schumann's Konzertstück for Four Horns and Orchestra (1849) with La Chambre Philharmonique (Emmanuel Krivine), the other horn players are Antoine Dreyfuss, Emmanuel Padieu and Bernard Schirrer, all 4 on Viennese horns; and the latest recording includes 2 tracks on the second album of the Anemos Quartet (trombones) – Anemos & Co – which are Arban's Carnival of Venice and Teutatès, fantaisie mystique by A. Corbin, with the Turbulences Ensemble (D. Guerrier, cornet; A. Ganaye, ophicleide; Chloé Ghisalberti, piano).

Awards 
 2000 – First Prize at the Maurice André International Competition in Paris
 2001 – First prize in the Philys Jone Competition with the Turbulences Brass Quintet.
 2003 – Prix  at the Midem in Cannes.
 2003 – Prix Young Concert Artist Auditions à New York.
 2003 – First Prize of the ARD International Music Competition

References

External links 
 David Guerrier (Orchestre Dijon Bourgogne)
 David Guerrier
 David Guerrier (France Musique)
 David Guerrier – Carnival Of Venice – Variations sur le Carnaval de Venise (YouTube)

1984 births
Living people
People from Drôme
Horn players
French classical trumpeters
Male trumpeters
21st-century French musicians
21st-century trumpeters
Eurovision Young Musicians Finalists
21st-century French male musicians